Fehér County was a county in Transylvania, Kingdom of Hungary between the 11th and the 18th century.

List of ispáns

References

Sources
  Engel, Pál (1996). Magyarország világi archontológiája, 1301–1457, I. ("Secular Archontology of Hungary, 1301–1457, Volume I"). História, MTA Történettudományi Intézete. Budapest. .
  Fallenbüchl, Zoltán (1994). Magyarország főispánjai, 1526–1848 ("Lord-Lieutenants of Counties in Hungary, 1526–1848"). Argumentum Kiadó.  .
  Zsoldos, Attila (2011). Magyarország világi archontológiája, 1000–1301 ("Secular Archontology of Hungary, 1000–1301"). História, MTA Történettudományi Intézete. Budapest. .

Kingdom of Hungary counties in Transylvania